The discography of Paul Kelly, an Australian rock artist, includes solo releases, those from various bands that Paul Kelly has led, and material from the related projects. Paul Kelly, under various guises, has released twenty-eight studio albums, sixty singles, forty-two music videos, and contributed to ten film / television soundtracks and scores.

In August 1978, Paul Kelly and the Dots was formed from the remains of Melbourne band High Rise Bombers. In 1979, they released their debut single, "Recognition", on Mushroom Records and followed with other singles in 1980 including "Billy Baxter" in October, which peaked at No. 38 on the National singles charts. Their debut album Talk followed in March 1981, which peaked at No. 44 on the National albums charts. Their single "Alive and Well", from the second album, Manila, had a video clip directed by Jack Egan in July 1982. After the Dots folded in late 1982, Kelly was without a recording contract. The Paul Kelly Band was formed in 1983, however by late 1984, Kelly had disbanded this group. His next solo release was the single "From St Kilda to Kings Cross" in April 1985, with the associated album Post.

By mid-1985, Kelly had formed Paul Kelly and the Coloured Girls and their first single was "Before Too Long" in June 1986, which peaked at No. 15 and was followed by a double LP Gossip in September, which peaked at No. 15. Gossip was trimmed back to a single LP for its 1987 international release on A&M Records under the name Paul Kelly and the Messengers. Australian releases still used Paul Kelly and the Coloured Girls. "To Her Door" was released in September 1987 and peaked at No. 14 on the Australian singles charts. "Dumb Things", another single from the album  Under the Sun, was released in 1988 in Australia, and the US. By 1989's So Much Water So Close to Home album the band were known as Paul Kelly and the Messengers in all markets, the album peaked at No. 10 with the next album Comedy from 1991 peaking at No. 12, but despite this success Paul Kelly and the Messengers disbanded in August 1991 with Hidden Things released in May 1992. Kelly was already touring as a solo artist and recorded Live, May 1992, he subsequently recorded further material under his own name, as the Paul Kelly Band, Paul Kelly and the Boon Companions, and Paul Kelly and the Stormwater Boys.

In 1999, Kelly left Mushroom Records and signed with EMI Music to release Smoke by Paul Kelly with Uncle Bill, which is a bluegrass band; released at the same time was Professor Ratbaggy by Professor Ratbaggy, a dub reggae group formed by Kelly with members of the Paul Kelly Band. Kelly toured with both Uncle Bill and Professor Ratbaggy. In a similar way Paul Kelly and the Boon Companions released Ways & Means in 2004 and became Stardust Five to release Stardust Five in 2006. In 2004, the Australian Broadcasting Corporation television series Fireflies featured a score by Kelly and Stephen Rae, the associated soundtrack CD Fireflies: Songs of Paul Kelly included tracks by Kelly, Paul Kelly and the Boon Companions, Professor Ratbaggy, Paul Kelly with Uncle Bill, and "Los Cucumbros" by the Boon Companions featuring Sian Prior, which was later a track on Stardust Five. Stolen Apples from 2007 was credited to Paul Kelly and followed by the live DVD Live Apples in April 2008 credited to Paul Kelly and the Boon Companions.

Albums

Studio albums

Live albums

Compilation albums

Video albums

Extended plays

Singles 

Notes

Music videos

Soundtracks

Other appearances

See also

 List of awards and nominations received by Paul Kelly – full listing of all awards won by the artist.

Notes

References

External links 

Paul Kelly, Paul Kelly and the Messengers, Paul Kelly and the Dots at MusicBrainz
Paul Kelly at Rate Your Music
Official Paul Kelly website

Discography
Discographies of Australian artists
Folk music discographies